Nigel Robertha (born 13 February 1998) is a Dutch professional footballer who plays as a forward for MLS side D.C. United. He has represented the Netherlands at the under-17 and under-18 levels.

Robertha began his career with Feyenoord, having joined them at the age of 11, but made just one appearance for the first team. In 2017 he joined Eerste Divisie side SC Cambuur. Two years later, he signed for Levski Sofia.

Club career

Feyenoord
Having progressed through the academy at Feyenoord, Robertha was handed his first professional contract with the club on 25 June 2015. He made his senior debut on 1 May 2016, being brought on by manager Giovanni van Bronckhorst in the 71st minute to replace Anass Achahbar in a 1–0 Eredivisie win over Willem II. At the end of the season he featured in Feyenoord's 10–0 win over VV Lyra in an exhibition match, scoring his first goal for the club. On 8 July he was one of five youth players promoted to the senior squad permanently. He failed to make an appearance for the senior side the following season, however, due in part to a hamstring tear he suffered during the course of the campaign.

Cambuur
On 5 July 2017, Robertha signed a two-year deal with Eerste Divisie side Cambuur as a free agent. He made his debut for the club on 18 August, coming on as a substitute in a 2–1 loss to Ajax II. The following month, he netted his first competitive goal when he scored in a 5–1 KNVB Cup win over Helmond Sport. He scored his first league goals on 12 January 2018, netting a brace in a 3–2 win over De Graafschap.

Levski Sofia
On 24 July 2019, Robertha signed a three-year deal with Bulgarian First League side Levski Sofia. On 3 March 2021, he scored his first hattrick for the club in a 3–1 win over Beroe in the Round of 16 of the Bulgarian Cup.

D.C. United
On 25 March 2021, Robertha moved to MLS side D.C. United on a deal until 2023, with a club option for a further year. On 17 April 2021, Robertha made his debut in United's 2021 season opener against New York City, where his side won 2–1. On 27 June, Robertha scored his first goal for his new club, netting the opener in an eventual 2–1 loss to New York City.

International career
Born in the Netherlands, Robertha is a youth international for the country. In June 2021, he was called up to the preliminary squad for the Curaçao national team for the 2021 CONCACAF Gold Cup.

Career statistics

Club

References

External links 
 Profile at LevskiSofia.info

1998 births
Living people
Dutch footballers
Netherlands youth international footballers
Eerste Divisie players
Eredivisie players
First Professional Football League (Bulgaria) players
EBOH players
Feyenoord players
SC Cambuur players
PFC Levski Sofia players
D.C. United players
Expatriate footballers in Bulgaria
Association football forwards
People from Vlaardingen
Dutch people of Curaçao descent
Curaçao footballers
Expatriate soccer players in the United States
Major League Soccer players
Footballers from South Holland